Ashot Melikjanyan or Melikdzhanyan (20 April 1952 — 12 November 2001) was a  Soviet Armenian actor.

Early life, family and education

Ashot Melikdjanyan was born in the Soviet Union on the 20th of April in 1952.

Career 
Melikdjanyan began his acting career at the Yerevan Dramatic Theater. His first on-screen performance was playing the role of Meruzhan in the 1972 film Ayrik. He then starred as the protagonist in the 1979 film Air Pedestrians, filmed at the Uzbekfilm film studio. He starred in the 1983 movie  Without much risk which was filmed at the Gorky Film Studio. Melikdjanyan's last appearance was in the 1990 movie Yearning, which was filmed at the Armenfilm studio. 

After the Soviet Union collapsed, Melikdjanyan emigrated with his family to the US, where he worked at a jewelry factory which supervised one of its branches in the Dominican Republic.

Personal life and demise
Melikdjanyan was killed in the crash of American Airlines Flight 587 in New York City on 12 November 2001.

Filmography

References 

Soviet male actors
2001 deaths
Soviet Armenians
1952 births
20th-century Armenian actors
American people of Armenian descent
Victims of aviation accidents or incidents in 2001
Accidental deaths in New York (state)
Soviet male film actors
Soviet emigrants to the United States